Ole Konrad Ribsskog (8 December 1865 – 26 January 1941) was a Norwegian educator and politician for the Labour and the Social Democratic Labour parties.

He was born in Flatanger as a son of farmers Johannes Olsen Ribsskog (1838–1910) and Marta Marie Ribsskog, née Høstland (1847–1901). He was an older brother of Adolf Ribsskog, headmaster and mayor of Steinkjer, and Bernhof Ribsskog, educator and social democratic politician.

He was elected to the Parliament of Norway from the constituency Baklandet in 1913, and served one term.

On the local level he was elected to Trondhjem city council in 1907. From 1917 to 1919 he was mayor. He also chaired the local party chapter. From 1921 to 1927 he was a member of the Social Democratic Labour Party.

Outside politics he worked as a school teacher. He had studied in Sweden, Denmark and Germany, worked as teacher in Flatanger, Spydeberg and Drøbak before moving to Trondhjem in 1893. From 1911 he was headmaster at Trondhjem public school.

He died in January 1941 when hit by a tram.

References

1865 births
1941 deaths
People from Flatanger
Heads of schools in Norway
Members of the Storting
Mayors of Trondheim
Labour Party (Norway) politicians
Social Democratic Labour Party of Norway politicians
Railway accident deaths in Norway